The following is a list of members of each session of the Georgia Executive Council from 1777 to 1789, when the Council was replaced by the Georgia State Senate.

List by session

1777 (May 8-)
 Officers
 Benjamin Andrew, President
 Samuel Stirk, Secretary
 Burke
 John Fulton
 Chatham
 Jonathan Bryan
 John Houstoun
 George Basil Spencer (serving Sep. 26)
 Charles Francis Chevalier (serving Sep. 26)
 Effingham
 Thomas Chisholm
 William Holzendorf
 Liberty
 John Jones
 Benjamin Andrew
 William Peacock
 Richmond
 Arthur Fort
 John Walton
 William Few
 Wilkes
 John Coleman
 John Lindsay

1778 (Jan.)
 Officers
 Richard Wylly, President
 Samuel Stirk, Secretary
 Robert Gray, Doorkeeper
 Adam Eurick, Messenger
 Burke
 John Fulton
 David Lewis
 Chatham
 Richard Wylly
 William Maxwell
 Effingham
 Jenkin Davis
 John Keebler(?)
 Liberty
 Samuel Miller
 Charles Kent(?)
 Richmond
 Chesley Bostwick
 Charles Crawford
 Wilkes
 John Lindsay
 Holman Freeman

1779 (Jan. 8-)
(Met at house of Mathew Hobson in Augusta, Jan. 8, 1779. Adjourned till the meeting of the next Convention.)

 Officers
 William Glascock, President (Jan. 21-)
 John Wilkinson, Secretary (Jan. 24-)
 Daniel Danielly, Messenger (Jan. 24-)
 Richmond
 Humphrey Wells

1779 (July 24-)
("Supreme Executive Council." Met at house of John Wilson in Augusta, Saturday, July 24, 1779 at 4 o'clock P. M. Met at the Church Aug. 3, 1779, according to adjournment.)

 Officers
 Seth John Cuthbert, President pro tempore (July 24-Aug. 6)
 John Wereat, President (Aug. 6-)
 Samuel Stirk, Secretary
 Daniel Danielly, Messenger
 Burke
 Myrick Davies
 Chatham
 Joseph Clay
 Joseph Habersham
 Seth John Cuthbert
 Richmond
 Humphrey Wells (surgeon)
 William Few
 Wilkes
 John Dooly
 Liberty?
 John Wereat
 Liberty? 
 William Gibbons, Sr.

1779 (Dec. 3-Jan. 7, 1780)
(Met in Augusta)

 Officers
 Richard Howley, President
 Burke
 John Twiggs
 Effingham
 John Bilbo
 Liberty
 Richard Howley (res. Jan. 3)
 John Hardy
 Richmond
 Robert Middleton
 Humphrey Wells (surgeon)
 Wilkes
 Micajah Williamson
 Stephen Heard
 James Brown

1780 (Jan. 7-)
(Dr. Folliott, occupying the building in Augusta called the Glebe, ordered to vacate it on Jan. 8, 1780 for the accommodation of the Governor and Executive Council. Council adjourned Feb. 5, 1781) to meet at Heard'* Fort.)

 Officers
 George Wells, President (Jan. 7-Feb. 15)
 Stephen Heard, President (Feb. 18-)
 Humphrey Wells, President pro tempore (Feb. 16-Feb. 18)
 Samuel Stirk, Secretary
 Daniel Danielly, Messenger
 Burke
 Myrick Davies
 Daniel McMurphy
 Chatham
 Peter Deveaux
 Effingham
 Caleb Howell
 John Bilbo
 Richmond
 Humphrey Wells (surgeon)
 George Wells (killed in duel)
 Wilkes
 Stephen Heard
 John Lindsay
 John Cunningham
 Chatham?
 John Heard

1781 (Aug. 17.)
(Met in Augusta; adjourned Oct. 9th to meet at Headquarters in Burke County. Met Oct. 16, 1781 at Howell's Plantation in Burke County; adjourned Oct. 26th to meet in Augusta on the following Tuesday, Oct. 30th.)

 Officers
 Myrick Davies, President
 Burke
 James Jones
 Myrick Davies
 Chatham
 Jonathan Bryan
 Charles Odingsells
 Effingham
 Abraham Ravot
 Jenkin Davis
 Liberty
 Joseph Woodruff
 William Gibbons, Sr.
 Richmond
 Humphrey Wells
 Benjamin Riden (elected but no record of service)
 Wilkes
 Daniel Coleman
 Absalom Bidwell (elected but no record of service)

1782 (Jan. 2-)
(Met in Augusta Jan. 2d; in Savannah July 14-Dec. 31, 1782.)

 Officers
 Stephen Heard, President (res.)
 Edward Jones, President (Aug. 30-)
 Abraham Jones, Secretary
 Seaborn Jones, Secretary (May 11-)
 Burke
 Thomas Lewis, Sr. (res.)
 Hugh Lawson, (res.)
 William Lord (declined seat in House of Assembly)
 Lemuel Lanier (elec. May 4)
 Benjamin Lewis (elec. May 4)
 Chatham
 Charles Odingsells
 Jonathan Bryan
 Peter Deveaux
 Effingham
 Abraham Ravot
 Jenkin Davis
 Edward Jones (seated Aug. 12)
 Liberty
 Joseph Woodruff (declared ineligible to seat in House of Assembly Apr. 22; non-resident)
 Samuel Saltus (declined)
 James Maxwell (res.)
 Thomas Maxwell (elec. July 20)
 Benjamin Andrew
 Richmond
 Andrew Burns (res.)
 Arthur Fort (Aug. 5-)
 William Glascock
 Wilkes
 Micajah Williamson (elec. July 20; declined)
 John Lindsay (seated Aug. 7)
 Stephen Heard
 Holman Freeman

1783 (Jan. 7-)
(Met in Savannah. Adjourned May 13th to meet in Augusta June 12th. Adjourned Aug. 2d to meet at Government House in Savannah Aug. 12th.)

 Officers
 Jenkin Davis, President (elected Jan. 27)
 David Rees, Secretary
 John Riley, Messenger and Doorkeeper
 Burke
 John Fulton
 Benjamin Lewis
 Chatham
 James Bryan
 John Morel (Feb. 13-)
 Effingham
 Jenkin Davis
 William Holzendorf
 Liberty
 John Elliott
 James Stewart
 Benjamin Andrew (seated Feb. 26; res. prior to July 15; served 33 days)
 Richmond
 Zacharias Fenn
 Charles Crawford (res. prior to July 15)
 Wilkes
 Walton Harris
 James Little (res. prior to July 15)

1784 (Jan. 9-)
(Met in Savannah Jan. 9th. Met in Augusta July 13th; adjourned July 30th to meet in Savannah; met there Aug. 10th. Adjourned Sep. 3d to meet in Augusta Sep. 10th; met Sep. 14th. Adjourned Oct. 1st to meet in Savannah; met Oct. 8th.)

 Officers
 John Habersham, President
 David Rees, Secretary
 John Riley, Messenger and Doorkeeper
 Burke
 John Green
 John Fulton (Mar. 23-)
 Chatham
 William Stephens
 John Habersham
 Effingham
 Jenkin Davis
 John Spencer
 Liberty
 James Powell
 Philip Lowe (res. Feb. 17)
 Benjamin Andrew (Feb. 26-)
 Richmond
 Zacharias Fenn
 James McNeil (declined)
 Robert Middleton (declined)
 James McFarland (Feb. 26-)
 Wilkes
 George Walton
 Daniel Coleman

1785
(Met in Savannah.)

 Officers
 John Morel, President
 George Handley, Secretary
 Burke
 John Clements
 Alexander Irvin
 Chatham
 John Morel
 Richard Gwinn (died Jan. 1785)
 Stephen Millen (Jan. 19-)
 Effingham
 Jenkin Davit
 John Spencer (declined)
 John Green (Jan. 14-)
 Liberty
 Benjamin Andrew, Sr.
 Edward Summer (declined)
 John Hardy (declined Feb. 20; re-elected Feb. 22)
 Richmond
 Jesse Saunders
 James Stalling! (declined)
 Cornelius Dysart (declined)
 Benjamin Porter (declined)
 James McNeil (Jan. 12-)
 Wilkes
 Stephen Heard (declined)
 Elijah Clarke (declined)
 John King (Jan. 13-)
 William Moore (Feb. 22-)

1786 (Jan. 16-)
(Met in Augusta.)

 Officers
 Thomas Napier, President
 Nathaniel Cocke, President pro tempore
 George Handley, Secretary
 Rd. Reynolds, Messenger and doorkeeper
 Burke
 Thomas Lewis
 John Green
 David Emanuel (Feb. 14-)
 Isaac Perry (Aug. 15-)
 Chatham
 William Gibbons, Jr.
 Charles Odingsells (res. in Feb.)
 William O'Bryan, Jr. (Feb. 14-)
 Effingham
 William Holzendorf
 Jenkin Davis (res.)
 John Green, Jr. (Aug. 15-)
 Joseph Jackson (Aug. 15-)
 Franklin Thomas Peter Carnes
 Jesse Walton
 Liberty
 Benjamin Andrew
 James Powell (failed to qualify)
 Nathan Brownson (Aug. 15-)
 William Steele (Aug. 15-)
 Richmond 
 Thomas Napier
 Nathaniel Cocke
 Washington
 Robert Christmas
 William Damell
 Wilkes 
 William Moss
 John Talbot (failed to qualify)
 Arthur Fort (declined)
 Jeremiah Walker (Feb. 11-)

1787 (Jan. 5-)
(Met in Augusta.)

 Officers
 John Cobbs, President
 James Meriwether, Secretary
 George Devine, Messenger
 John Temple, Messenger (app. prior to Mar. 22)
 Burke
 Edmund Byne
 William Green (died)
 Joel Rees (Nov. 1-)
 Camden
 Robert Montfort (res. Jan. 27)
 James Armstrong (Feb. 13-)
 Thomas Washington
 Ferdinand O'Neal (vice Washington)
 Chatham
 Josiah Tattnall, Jr.
 James Gunn (declined)
 James Moore (Jan. 19-)
 Benjamin Fishbourne (Feb. 15-; vice Moore)
 Effingham
 John Green
 McKeen Green
 Franklin Jesse Walton
 Neil Cleveland
 Greene
 Thomas Harris
 David Love
 Richard Worsham (Feb. 12-)
 Liberty
 John Mclntosh, Jr.
 Hepworth Carter (Jan. 18-Feb. 8, res.)
 James Powell (vice Carter)
 Richmond
 John Cobbs
 Henry Allison
 Washington
 John Barclay
 Reuben Wilkinson
 Wilkes
 Andrew Bums
 William Moore (res.)
 John King (Feb. 12-)

1788
(Met in Augusta.)

 Officers
 William O'Bryan, President (elec. Jan. 8; declined Jan. 12)
 George Handley, President (Jan. 15-)
 Benjamin Fishbourne, President (Jan. 31-)
 James Meriwether, Secretary
 John Temple, Messenger and Doorkeeper (place declared vacant May 28; Temple absent without leave)
 William Hall, Messenger and Doorkeeper (June 3-)
 Burke
 John Peter Wagnon
 Hugh Lawson
 Camden
 James Armstrong (elec. Jan. 7; seated Aug. 19)
 ................ Young (elected but no record of service)
 Chatham
 William O'Bryan (declined)
 Benjamin Maxwell (res. Jan. 25)
 Benjamin Fishbourne (Jan. 31-)
 Josiah Tattnall (declined)
 Joseph Day (elec. Jan. 30; Council declared election unconstitutional; requested Assembly to select councillor from those present in House)
 Effingham
 John Green
 McKeen Green
 Franklin Neil Cleveland
 Middleton Woods
 Glynn
 William Stevens (did not take seat in House)
 George Handley (Jan. 15-)
 John Tompkins (res.)
 Christopher Hillary (Feb. 2-)
 Greene
 Robert Middleton
 William Daniell
 Liberty
 Elihu Lyman
 ................ Dunwoody (elected but no record of service)
 Richmond
 William Flournoy Hooker
 Joel Crawford, Sr.
 Washington
 Thacker Vivion
 Daniel Bankston
 Alexander Irvin (Feb. 2-; vice Bankston)
 Wilkes
 John Talbot
 William Moss

1789
(Met in Augusta.)

 Officers
 Hugh Lawson, President
 William Hall, Messenger and Doorkeeper
 Burke
 William Little
 Hugh Lawson
 Camden
 Abner Williams (did not serve)
 John Alexander (elected but no record of service)
 Jacob Weed (Jan. 21-; vice Williams)
 Simeon Dillingham (elec. Feb. 4; seated May 9)
 Chatham
 David Fisher
 Thomas Gibbons
 Effingham
 John Green
 Joseph Jackson (did not serve)
 Oliver Bowen (elec. Jan. 21; declined)
 Israel Bird (elected Jan. 23, vice Bowen, but no record of service)
 Franklin
 Middleton Woods
 Neil Cleveland
 Glynn
 James Spalding (did not serve)
 Raymond Demere (declined)
 Elisha B. Hopkins
 Christopher Hillary
 Greene
 Roberds Thomas
 Rene Fitzpatrick
 Liberty
 Elihu Lvman
 James Powell (elected but no record of service)
 Job Pray (Feb. 6-)
 Richmond
 William Flournoy Booker
 William Stevens (declined)
 Henry Allison (died prior to July 7)
 Washington
 John Watts (did not serve)
 Daniel Bankston (declined)
 Joshua Williams (Jan. 21-; vice Bankston)
 Jared Irwin (elec. Feb. 4; seated Feb. 25; vice Watts)
 Wilkes
 James Williams
 Nathaniel Christmas

External links
 Georgia Official and Statistical Register 1977

Georgia General Assembly